The Arular Tour is a global concert tour by M.I.A. performed in support of her first studio album Arular (2005). It took place from 2005 to 2006.

The tour featured dates across North America, South America, Canada, Europe, Asia and Australasia. M.I.A. performed sporadically near the end of 2004. One of M.I.A.'s first live performances in London took place in November 2004. She also performed at an event in Puerto Rico and minor gigs in places such as Philadelphia and New York City in the U.S., as well as Hamburg and Berlin in Germany in 2004. Her 2005 tour began with her North American debut performance at the Drake Hotel in Toronto, Ontario on 2 February 2005.

Tour details
The Arular Tour setlist featured songs from her debut album Arular. Some mixes from her mixtape Piracy Funds Terrorism were also performed. M.I.A. did not follow the same setlist at every show. M.I.A. spoke in 2005 of wanting to make her live set "minimal," inspired by gigs of acts such as electroclash musician Peaches which she attended whilst travelling and filming a documentary on her. M.I.A.'s concert following the Drake Hotel gig received a response described as "phenomenal" by organiser Jacob Smid, with attendees already knowing many of her songs.

Sets were sometimes decorated with palm fronds. The stage featured coloured drapes, canvasses and flags she created with prints of her graffiti stencils, paintings, and her album and singles artwork. These featured pictures of anonymous rebel soldiers, tigers, tanks and guns amid jagged colourful patterns. Her stage attire featured similar prints. She wore many contrasting outfits, nearly every item of clothing hand made by friends such as Carri Mundane and herself. In some shows, a video screen displayed images of tigers, looping fighter jets, maps of London and oil rigs.

Coachella 2005
M.I.A ended her set in the Gobi tent at the 2005 Coachella Valley Music and Arts Festival with the song "Galang", leading to an encore in response to crowd enthusiasm, a rarity for the festival and the first tent encore at Coachella. Describing the performance she said, "When I played three years ago, it was such a crazy moment. It was my first festival and I had only done about five shows in my entire life...They dismantled the stage and had to put it back together because all the people started going, 'M.I.A! M.I.A!' I don't think I'd ever be able to do something like that again, because it was my moment."

Later tour
Additionally, M.I.A. co-headlined tours with Roots Manuva and LCD Soundsystem during 2005. Her dates from 10 May at the Commodore Ballroom, Canada to 12 June at the 9:30 Club, US were performed with LCD Soundsystem. M.I.A. performed with backup singer Cherry and DJ Diplo on many dates. Spank Rock opened for M.I.A. on a few dates, as did DJ's Rekha, Marlboro and Contra who made appearances on some dates during the tour. Concerts took place at club venues and music festivals. She joined Gwen Stefani on her 2005 tour and ended the Arular tour with performances in Japan in February 2006. M.I.A. performed several sold-out shows during her tour, with Aziz Ansari, Feist, David Byrne, Nas, Kelis, Matt Damon and Natalie Portman among those attending concerts. Recording for her second album Kala followed this tour, which preceded the 2007 KALA Tour.

Set list
This is the set-list from M.I.A.'s sold-out concert at the club S.O.B.s in Manhattan U.S..
"Pull Up the People"
"Fire Fire"
"Sunshowers"
"Hombre"
"M.I.A."
"Amazon"
"10 Dollar"
"Bucky Done Gun"
"Galang"
"U.R.A.Q.T."
"Bingo"

Tour dates

Notes

References

External links
 Official site
M.I.A. The IGN interview, 2005

2005 concert tours
2006 concert tours
M.I.A. (rapper) concert tours